Sebastian is the 2006 debut album from Swedish Pop/Rock singer Sebastian Karlsson, led by the first single and four weeks No. 1 hit "Do What You're Told". The album was released on March 1, debuting at No. 1 in Sweden, and not falling until a few weeks thereafter. More than 30.000 copies of the album have been sold, certificating gold the album.

Track listing

Indifferent
Bring Me Some Water
Do What You're Told
Life On Mars
Birthmarks
This House Is Not For Sale (Ryan Adams)
Stay Real
Start Me Up
Human
Diamond

Singles from the album

 Do What You're Told #1 (4 weeks)
Released date: February 1, 2006

 Indifferent No. 38
Released date: April 26, 2006

 Bring Me Some Water (promotional)

References

 

2006 albums
Sebastian Karlsson (singer) albums
Sony BMG albums